Madhuca pasquieri is a species of plant in the family Sapotaceae. It is found in China and Vietnam. It is threatened by habitat loss and overharvesting for its timber.

References

pasquieri
Trees of China
Trees of Vietnam
Vulnerable plants
Taxonomy articles created by Polbot